Peter Braun may refer to:

 Peter Braun (runner) (born 1962), German middle-distance runner
 Peter Braun (skier), West German para-alpine skier
 Peter Leonhard Braun (born 1929), German writer and radio producer

See also
 Peter-Victor Braun (1825–1882), French Catholic priest